Springfield School District (SSD) is a midsized, suburban, (K–12th) public school district located in Springfield Township, Delaware County, Pennsylvania. It also serves the neighboring Morton Borough. The district is one of the 500 public school districts of Pennsylvania. Springfield School District encompasses just . According to 2000 federal census data, it served a resident population of 26,392. By 2010, the district's population increased to 27,515 people. The educational attainment levels for the Springfield School District population (25 years old and over) were 95.1% high school graduates and 38.6% college graduates. In the 2010 census, the median household income was $87,878 compared to $52,267 in Pennsylvania. The percent of families in poverty was 3.0; the percent of all people in poverty was 3.9; the percent of people under 18 years in poverty was 6.0.

Springfield School District operates two elementary schools (2–5), Scenic Hills Elementary School and Harvey C. Sabold Elementary School. Junior high students (6–8) attend E.T. Richardson Middle School, and high school students (9–12) attend Springfield High School. Students in (K-1) attend the Springfield Literacy Center that opened for the 2010 school year. The district's administration office as connected to the high school building.

Springfield High School students may choose to attend Delaware County Technical High School for training in the construction and mechanical trades. The Delaware County Intermediate Unit IU25 provides the district with a wide variety of services like specialized education for disabled students and hearing, speech and visual disability services and professional development for staff and faculty.

History
Families in Springfield Township could choose to send their children to Swarthmore High School, Lansdowne High School, and/or Media High School prior to the 1931 establishment of Springfield High School.

Extracurriculars
Springfield School District offers a wide variety of clubs, activities and an extensive, publicly funded sports program.

Athletics
The Springfield Cougars compete in many varsity and Junior varsity sports each participating in the Central League.

Varsity

Boys
Baseball - AAAA
Basketball- AAAAA
Cross country - AAA
Football - AAAAA
Golf - AAA
Indoor track and field - AAAA
Lacrosse - AAAA
Soccer - AAA
Swimming and diving - AAA
Tennis - AAA
Track and field - AAA
Wrestling - AAA

Girls
Basketball - AAAA
Cross country - AAA
Indoor track and field - AAAA
Field hockey - AAA
Lacrosse - AAAA
Soccer - AAA
Softball - AAAA
Swimming and diving - AAA
Tennis - AAA
Track and field - AAA
Volleyball - AAA
Cheerleading

Middle school sports

Boys
Baseball
Basketball
Football
Lacrosse
Soccer
Track and field
Wrestling 

Girls
Basketball
Field hockey
Lacrosse
Soccer
Softball
Track and field
Volleyball

Football

The Springfield Cougars Football Program which started in 1932 has seen four Central league championships in 1962, 1963, 1989, 1994, 2014, 2016, 2017. In 2008 The Cougars hired ex University of Virginia Quarterback and Downingtown East and West Chester Rustin Offensive Coordinator Dan Ellis as Head Coach in 2008 who replaced Head Coach Chris Bell who went only 5–25 in 3 seasons. Coach Ellis lead the team to a 7-3 regular season record and a state playoff victory over Bishop Shanahan. To fill Ellis' place, Springfield promoted lineman coach Tom Kline, a longtime colleague of Ellis', to Head Coach in 2011 who lead the Cougars to an 8-2 regular season record only to lose in their first home playoff game to Academy Park. In 2012 The Cougars went 7-4 under Kline, including a win over Garnet Valley which was a rematch from the previous season's loss. The Cougars lost to West Chester Henderson in the first round of the playoffs. In 2013 the Cougars went 6–5, among the wins was a 45–6 victory over Strath Haven. This marked the first time that Springfield defeated Strath haven since 1994. In December 2013 Tom Kline stepped down as head coach for personal reasons. In early February 2014, long time Assistant Coach, and colleague of Tom Kline, Chris Britton who's been with the team since 2002 was promoted to head coach for Springfield. Coach Britton led the Cougars to an undefeated 10–0 season to win the 2014 Central League for the 1st time since 1994 only to lose in the District 1 championship to Great Valley High School after beating Interboro High School and Pottsgrove High School to finish 12-1 overall. The 2014-15 Cougar Football Season was the most successful team in high school history. The Cougars Varsity football in the 2016–17 season after a rivalry showdown victory in OT. over the Ridley High School Green Raiders for the first time since 1994, and went on to make it to the district championship only to fall to Academy Park finishing with an overall record of 12–2, and winning a share of the Central League Title with Ridley, Garnet Valley, and Marple Newtown. The following season in 2017-18 campaign the Cougars won their 3rd Central League Championship title in 3 years only to lose to Unionville High School. The Cougars played their last home football game in 2018 against Unionville High School, to make way for a new turf field to be installed along with the new high school project, the Cougars football team played their home games at Strath Haven High School in Wallingford as their temporary site for the 2019 season.

Basketball
For the past few years the Cougars had success under head coach Kevin McCormick Sr who was hired in 2000, who led the men's basketball team to multiple championships. On December 28 the Cougars won the William Allen Holiday against William Allen HS in OT, after trailing 23–6 in the 1st quarter.

The Lady Cougars coached by Kimberly Smith finished their season with an overall record of 10-14 and defeated Marple Newtown 50–41, and lost in the second round to Villa Joseph Marie 43–30.  In the 2019 season led by new head coach Meghan Dorrian led the girls basketball team to a 24–5 record only to Archbishop Wood in the first round of the state playoffs. On February 19 Jordan D'Ambrosio broke the school's all-time scoring record with 1195 total points.

Cheerleading
In February 2016 the Springfield Varsity Cheerleading Squad formerly coached by Kristen La'Barca and Molly Ries, traveled to Orlando to compete in the annual UCA and went on to win the PIAA State title as well as being crowned National Cheerleading Champions. The team is currently coached by Maggie McCloskey, and former University of Alabama cheerleader Kelly Yeager

Lacrosse
Springfield High School is also well known for their boys' lacrosse team. In the last few seasons the boys finished each season except for 2007–08 season at .500, with 10 wins or more. Springfield won the district 1 championship for lacrosse in 2015. On June 13 the 2016 boys lacrosse team defeated La Salle, 4–3 to win the PIAA State Championship.

Tennis
The boys' tennis team continued their upward surge in the 2016 season. They were led by singles players Tyler Stroyek, Michael Bonacquisti, and Jacinth Chikkala. Playing doubles was Joe Rice/ Ryan Busch, Joe Colgan/Chris Fleming, Justin Collins/ Adam Dickerson, and Ben Siti/ James Shickling. They were coached by Steve Fattori.

Softball
In the 2013–14 softball season, the girls' softball team went 23–4, and went on to  defeat Bethlehem Catholic 3–0 to capture their first Class AAA PIAA District 1 State title.

Ice hockey
The Cougars Ice hockey program has seen a lot of success over the years under head coach Phil Eastman, winning the championship in 2007, 2011, 2013, and 2014. In 2014 In 2014 the Cougars Ice hockey team won their 2nd straight central league title.

Music programs
The high school has a band orchestra and choir.

Academics
The high school and middle school have one of the best Pennsylvania Junior Academy of Science teams in the state. The current era of the team started in the 2006–2007 school year. Since then the team has grown to 32 members in the 2010–2011 school year.  Approximately 85-90% of the students qualify for the state meet each year. This is much higher than the normal qualification rate of 65-70%. Students from Springfield have placed extremely well over the past few years and in that past two years 7 the 7 eligible students have won scholarships. The team has also accumulated over $100,000.00 in prizes and scholarships in the past 5 years.

Steve Stefani Dance Marathon
Steve Stefani Dance Marathon is an annual charity event held at Springfield High School each year; proceeds go to the Four Diamonds Fund to go towards fighting pediatric cancer for kids across Pennsylvania. Steve Stefani Dance Marathon was originally created by a teacher who works at Springfield High School to honor Steve Stefani, a beloved social studies teacher who worked at Sabold Elementary and Springfield High School, and died of cancer. In 2013 participants raised over $190,000 to go towards fighting pediatric cancer. In 2014 the Steve Stefani Dance Marathon raised $224,598,71 to go towards fighting pediatric cancer. To date the Steve Stefani Raised over $1 million in 11 years. In 2018 the participants raised $244,750,57.

Turkey Games
The Turkey Games is an annual flag football tournament that began in 2015, that is held every 3rd Wednesday before Thanksgiving. The proceeds go to the Turkey fund for the homeless, and needy. In 2018 those who were involved were encouraged to donate winter clothing such is gloves, hats, and coats.

Brunner Bash
The Brunner Bash is a six-hour marathon similar to the Steve Stefani Dance Marathon that honors Sabold teacher Glen Brunner, who died of cancer. The bash occurs every year and students may not sit and be physically active for six hours at the middle school. The proceeds support the Steve Stefani Dance Marathon.

Future development
On June 10, 2015, Springfield School Board voted in an 8–1 decision to build a new high school. The construction of the new high school began in 2018 and was completed in early 2021. The old high school was  demolished,to way for new playing fields and installation of the visiting teams bleachers which concluded in 2022.

Notable alumn
Robert Hazard, rock musician

References

External links
 
 
Springfield Area Educational Foundation
Springfield Football Homepage
Springfield Music Homepage

School districts in Delaware County, Pennsylvania
Springfield Township, Delaware County, Pennsylvania